Cycloclasticus pugetii is a species of bacterium found in marine sediments. It is notable for being able to break down aromatic hydrocarbon, including naphthalene, phenanthrene, anthracene and toluene. It is an aerobic, gram-negative, rod-shaped bacterium from the family Piscirickettsiaceae, and it is motile by means of single polar flagellum. Strain PS-1 is its type strain.
It was named in honor of Peter Puget.

References

Further reading
Geiselbrecht, Allison D., et al. "Isolation of marine polycyclic aromatic hydrocarbon (PAH)-degrading Cycloclasticus strains from the Gulf of Mexico and comparison of their PAH degradation ability with that of Puget Sound Cycloclasticus strains." Applied and Environmental Microbiology 64.12 (1998): 4703–4710.

External links

WORMS entry
LPSN

Thiotrichales
Bacteria described in 1995